Yoel Matveyev (יואל מאַטוועיעוו), born in 1976, is a Yiddish poet, writer and journalist from Leningrad, USSR with background in computer programming. He taught himself Yiddish at high school age and started writing Yiddish poetry as a teenager. Matveyev is also a Russian writer and poet.

Matveyev's poems, prose and verse translations of Russian poetry into Yiddish were published  in the literary magazines Der Nayer Fraynd, Der Bavebter Yid, Yugntruf, Di Tsukunft, Yiddishland, the newspaper Birobidzhaner Shtern, read on the Israeli international radio Kol Israel, published in several books, including Step By Step, a 2009 anthology of contemporary Yiddish poetry with parallel English translation and A Ring, a 2017 anthology of contemporary Yiddish poetry.

In 2002, he started working as a staff writer for the Yiddish Forward. In 2004-2005, Matveyev helped to establish and coedited the magazine Der Nayer Fraynd, the only Yiddish literary magazine that existed at that time in Russia founded by Yisroel Nekrasov, a Yiddish poet who lives in Saint Petersburg. Matveyev's articles also appeared in English, Russian and Croatian publications. In 2017 Matveyev returned to his home city, Saint Petersburg, where he is currently based.

Bibliography
 Step by Step, Contemporary Yiddish Poetry, 2009, edited by Elissa Bemporad & Margherita Pascucci, 
 A Ring, Contemporary Yiddish Poetry, 2017, edited by Velvl Chernin & Michael Felzenbaum, 
 Almanac Birobidzhan (v. 16, 2021), edited by Yelena Sarashevskaya,

External links 
  Yoel Matveyev's articles in the Yiddish Forward
  Yoel Matveyev's poem translated from Yiddish into Russian by Yisroel Nekrasov

References

Jewish poets
Yiddish-language poets
Living people
1976 births